Choeradodis stalii is a species of praying mantis with common names that include tropical shield mantis, hooded mantis, and leaf mantis.  It is found in Brazil, Ecuador, French Guiana, Panama, and Peru.

As described by one insect-breeding hobbyist, this species:

...is one of the most impressive of all mimic species. It takes the form of a leaf one step further than any other species, and has the largest hood of all leaf species. They take the form of a flat stance, and spend most of their time low-lying, to help blend in with their background. This mantis species is rare in captivity, and only experienced breeders will have these available/have reared them successfully in the past.

Nymphs of this species are born with a bright red color distinguishing them from other Choeradodis spp. Even at early instars, they display somewhat of a hood. Each time the larvae moult, they grow more greenish and their hood grows larger, until they reach adulthood.

See also 

 List of mantis genera and species

References 

Mantidae
Mantodea of South America
Insects of Brazil
Fauna of Ecuador
Arthropods of South America
Fauna of French Guiana
Insects of Central America
Fauna of Peru
Insects of South America
Insect rearing
Insects described in 1880